Tingonleima Chanu Kshetrimayum (born 1 April 1976) is a member of the India women's national field hockey team. She hails from Manipur and played with the team when it won the Gold at the Manchester 2002 Commonwealth Games. She also earned the Arjuna Award.

References 
Biography
Commonwealth Games Biography

1976 births
Living people
Field hockey players from Manipur
Indian female field hockey players
Female field hockey goalkeepers
Recipients of the Arjuna Award
Field hockey players at the 2002 Commonwealth Games
Commonwealth Games gold medallists for India
Field hockey players at the 1994 Asian Games
Field hockey players at the 1998 Asian Games
Field hockey players at the 2002 Asian Games
Medalists at the 1998 Asian Games
Asian Games medalists in field hockey
Asian Games silver medalists for India
Sportswomen from Manipur
Commonwealth Games medallists in field hockey
21st-century Indian women
21st-century Indian people
Medallists at the 2002 Commonwealth Games